Qaleh-ye Akbarabad (also Romanized as Qal‘eh-ye Akbarābād) is a village in Kohanabad Rural District, Kohanabad District, Aradan County, Semnan Province, Iran. At the 2006 census, its population was 13, in 4 families.

References 

Populated places in Aradan County